Doratopteryx is a genus of moths in the Himantopteridae family.

Species
 Doratopteryx afra Rogenhofer, 1884
 Doratopteryx camerunica Hering, 1937
 Doratopteryx collarti Hering, 1937
 Doratopteryx dissemurus Kiriakoff, 1963
 Doratopteryx filipennis Hering, 1937
 Doratopteryx flavomaculata Hering, 1937
 Doratopteryx fulva Hering, 1937
 Doratopteryx laticauda Hering, 1937
 Doratopteryx latipennis Hering, 1937
 Doratopteryx plumigera Butler, 1888
 Doratopteryx steniptera Hampson, 1919
 Doratopteryx xanthomelas Rothschild & Jordan, 1903
 Doratopteryx zopheropa Bethune-Baker, 1911

References

Himantopteridae
Zygaenoidea genera
Taxa named by Alois Friedrich Rogenhofer